Yousuf Babar (born 10 December 1997) is a Pakistani cricketer. He made his List A debut for Multan in the 2018–19 Quaid-e-Azam One Day Cup on 30 September 2018. He made his first-class debut for Multan in the 2018–19 Quaid-e-Azam Trophy on 11 October 2018. He made his Twenty20 debut on 10 October 2021, for Southern Punjab in the 2021–22 National T20 Cup.

References

External links
 

1997 births
Living people
Pakistani cricketers
Multan cricketers
Place of birth missing (living people)